West Ballina is a suburb of Ballina located in the Northern Rivers Region of New South Wales.

Demographics
The median age of persons in West Ballina was 54 years. There were less males than females, with 48.3% of the population male and 51.7% female. The average household size was 2.1 people per household.

References 

Towns in New South Wales
Northern Rivers